Mane Rokvić was a Serbian guerrilla commander during the Second World War. Rokvić briefly commanded of the Yugoslav Partisan 4th detachment of the Sloboda Battalion during the 1941 Drvar uprising, a spontaneous resistance by the Serbian population to the genocidal activities of the Independent State of Croatia in Western Bosnia. Later and most notably, Rokvić left the communist cause to join the royalist Dinara Chetnik Division to command of the King Alexander I regiment.

Early life
Rokvić was born in Kolunić near Bosanski Petrovac, in modern-day Bosnia and Herzegovina. Prior to the Second World War, Rokvić was employed as a mechanic in the Šipad lumber and furniture factory in Drvar. He joined the Yugoslav Communist Party in 1929.

World War II
As commander of the Medeno Polje based 4th detachment of Sloboda Battalion, Rokvić is credited with successfully attacking Croatian fascist ustaše forces in Pasjak near Drvar on 26 July 1941. With the momentum of victory, Rokvić's detachment subsequently liberated the towns of Drvar, Bosansko Grahovo and village of Oštrelj with three other Partisan detachments in what is known as the Drvar uprising.

Following the Drvar uprising, Rokvić broke ranks with the communist Partisans and joined the royalist Serbian Chetnik cause after learning that Yugoslav Partisans under instructions of Croatian communists razed Serbian homes in Drvar prior to Italian occupation forces arriving.

Upon joining the Serbian royalist cause in the fall of 1941, Rokvić stood up the King Alexander I regiment, one of six regiments that would later form the Dinara Chetnik Division led by Serbian Orthodox priest, turned guerrilla, Vojvoda Momčilo Đujić.

As commander of the King Aleksandar I regiment, which for certain time was garrisoned in Drvar, Rokvić along with the commander of the Gavrilo Princip regiment Branko Bogunović, was promoted to the rank of vojvoda by Chetnik veteran organizer Ilija Trifunović Birčanin.

Together with Momčilo Đujić, Pavle Popović, Pavle Omčikus, and Branko Bogunović; Rokvić agreed to and co-signed the Elaborat of Dinara Division in March 1942. Earlier that year, Rokvić was decorated by president of the Yugoslav government-in-exile Slobodan Jovanović with the Karađorđe's Star. 

After the Italian capitulation at the end of 1943, 600 Chetnik fighters under the command of Rokvić operated in the southwestern part of the Bosnian Krajina along the Bosansko Grahovo-Drvar-Bosanski Petrovac-Bihać corridor. 

It is believed that at the end of 1944, Rokvić withdrew his forces towards Slovenia where it is believed that he was captured and subsequently murdered by the Croatian ustaše.

References

Sources 

 
 
 
 
 
 
 
 
 
 
 
 

1944 deaths
Chetnik personnel of World War II
Royal Yugoslav Army personnel
People from Bosanski Petrovac
Serbs of Bosnia and Herzegovina